The Women's doubles event of badminton at the 2010 Commonwealth Games was held from 10 to 14 October 2010 in Siri Fort Sports Complex, New Delhi, India.

Finals

References
Reports

Badminton at the 2010 Commonwealth Games
Comm